Pétrola is a municipality in Albacete, Castile-La Mancha, Spain, in a fertile valley watered by cascades and small rivers. The town's name comes from the ancient Roman word "petra", meaning 'stone'.

It has a population of 877 people. It is famous because of its salt water lake. The economy is mainly based in agriculture (cereals and vines) and farming and have lambs and sheep mainly. It is 35 km from Albacete, capital of the province. In the summer time, its population increases to nearly 2,000 people due to the tourists, most of them sons of the people that emigrate.

La Cremita is the only night club there and Patricio's Pub is the only pub available every day and there are some other bars like Almendros, La topera and el Chiringuito, open only in summertime. Juan Gómez Morote is the name of the mayor; member of the partido popular political party.

Municipalities of the Province of Albacete